The 1986 U.S. Women's Open was the 41st U.S. Women's Open, held July 10–14 at the South Course of NCR Country Club in Kettering, Ohio, a suburb south of Dayton.

Jane Geddes won the first of her two major titles in an 18-hole Monday playoff, winning by two strokes over Sally Little. It was the fifth playoff at the U.S. Women's Open and the first in ten years.

This was the only of the four majors in 1986 that was not won by Pat Bradley; she narrowly missed the grand slam with a fifth-place finish, three strokes back.

NCR's South Course previously hosted the PGA Championship in 1969.

Past champions in the field

Made the cut

Source:

Missed the cut

Source:

Final leaderboard
Sunday, July 13, 1986

Source:

Playoff 
Monday, July 14, 1986

Source:

Scorecard

Source:

References

External links
U.S. Women's Open - past champions - 1986

U.S. Women's Open
Golf in Ohio
Sports competitions in Ohio
Kettering, Ohio
Women in Ohio
U.S. Women's Open
U.S. Women's Open
U.S. Women's Open
U.S. Women's Open
Women's sports in Ohio